Maor Janah (born February 10, 1984) is a former Israeli professional football (soccer) player.

External links
  Profile and biography of Maor Janah on Maccabi Haifa's official website

1984 births
Living people
Israeli Jews
Israeli footballers
Maccabi Haifa F.C. players
Hapoel Nof HaGalil F.C. players
Maccabi Herzliya F.C. players
Hapoel Ashkelon F.C. players
Maccabi Ironi Tirat HaCarmel F.C. players
Hapoel Ironi Kiryat Shmona F.C. players
Maccabi Ironi Kiryat Ata F.C. players
F.C. Givat Olga players
Hapoel Migdal HaEmek F.C. players
Hapoel Hadera F.C. players
Ihud Bnei Kafr Qara F.C. players
Hapoel Asi Gilboa F.C. players
Liga Leumit players
Israeli Premier League players
Footballers from Haifa
Israeli people of Yemeni-Jewish descent
Association football midfielders